The Family Next Door may refer to:

 The Family Next Door (1912 film)
 The Family Next Door (1939 film)
 "The Family Next Door", a 1979 episode of the TV series All in the Family
 "The Family Next Door", an episode of the Evangelical Christian radio series Adventures in Odyssey
 The Family Next Door, a comic strip created by Bob Satterfield (cartoonist) (1875–1958)
 "The Family Next Door", a track on the 1994 album Buddha by American rock band Blink-182
 The Family Next Door, a 2008 book by Jackie Diamond Hyman
 The Family Next Door, a 2018 book by Sally Hepworth